Systematic and Applied Microbiology is a peer-reviewed bimonthly journal deals with various aspects of microbial diversity and systematics of prokaryotes. It focuses on Bacteria and Archaea; eukaryotic microorganisms will only be considered in rare cases. According to the Journal Citation Reports, the journal has a 2014 impact factor of 3.283.

References

English-language journals
Applied microbiology journals
Prokaryote taxonomy